MAP International is a Christian nonprofit organization based out of Brunswick, Georgia. Their mission is to provide medicines and health supplies to those in need around the world so they might experience life to the fullest. MAP serves all people regardless of religion, gender, race, nationality, or ethnic background. As a global health organization, they carry out work in the broad programmatic areas of disease prevention and treatment, disaster relief, and medical missions support, with the goal of bringing health and hope to the 2 billion people worldwide who do not have access to basic healthcare.

History

Establishment 
MAP International was founded in 1954 by J. Raymond Knighton, the first Executive Director of the Christian Medical Society, now known as the Christian Medical and Dental Associations (CMDA). Ray had heard reports of missionary doctors in remote parts of the world who lacked the necessary medicines and health supplies to adequately treat their patients. He became passionate about this need and mentioned it to nearly everyone he met. One day, a truck with 11 tons of pharmaceuticals from the Schering Drug Company showed up at Ray’s Chicago office. Art Larson, an executive at Schering, had heard of Ray Knighton and figured that he could find a way to put the extra stock of medicines to good use. With that, the Christian Medical Society launched the outreach that would later become MAP International. Ray Knighton began by matching up excess pharmaceuticals with doctors in impoverished countries, and the mission has grown since then. Knighton served as the president of MAP International until 1980, and passed away in 2003 at the age of 81.

Current CEO Steve Stirling 
Steve Stirling has served as the President and CEO since 2014. As a young child living in post-war Korea in the 1960s, Steve suffered a life-altering bout with polio – a disease that wreaked havoc on his body and ostracized him from society, and ultimately, his family. This disease, and its consequences, could have been prevented with a vaccine that costs merely a few cents.
When Steve was only 5 years old, his father dropped him and his sister off an orphanage, where they spent the next 5 years before being adopted by a couple in the U.S. Steve eventually graduated from Cornell University with a degree in Agricultural Economics and earned his MBA in Marketing and Finance from Northwestern University.
Prior to joining MAP International, Steve held executive-level positions with nonprofits including Child Fund International, Heifer International, ChildHelp and WorldVision US and in corporations including: Bristol-Myers Squibb, Conagra Foods, AmeriTrade and Univera Life Sciences. Steve has dedicated his life to bringing critically needed medicines and health supplies to some of the world’s poorest people, so that no child suffers the same fate that he did simply because of a lack of access to medicine. God redeemed every experience in Steve’s life, even polio, to prepare him for his role at MAP International. He is particularly motivated by Jesus’s words in Matthew 25:36, “I was sick, and you looked after me.”

Mission 
MAP International’s mission is to provide medicines and health supplies to those in need around the world so that they might experience life to the fullest.

Financials and Credentials 
MAP International has been known as an organization that delivers quality medicines to those in need with a remarkably low overhead. In 2019, MAP delivered medicines and health supplies to 13.3 million people in 98 countries – all with a staff of fewer than 40 people.
In fact, Forbes magazine recently gave MAP a 99% efficiency rating in its investment guide (compared to the average efficiency rating of 90%). Charity Navigator, another reputable charity watchdog, has given MAP International an impressive 4-star rating, an honor that is only awarded to the most fiscally responsible organizations.
MAP International has also been awarded the highest level of recognition offered by GuideStar – the Platinum Seal of Transparency, in 2019. In addition, CNBC lists MAP International as one of the “Top Ten Charities in The World” because “they manage to do exceptional work both at home and abroad, all while maintaining top-notch financial management and transparency standards.”
MAP International is also affirmed as an accredited charity by the Better Business Bureau and is rated #23 in the Top 100 Charities in America.

Credibility 
Forbes, Inc. recognizes MAP International as the #37 Largest U.S. Charity.  BBB lists MAP International as an accredited charity, meaning it meets the standards in terms of governance, measuring effectiveness, finances, and fund raising and information.  CNBC named MAP International #2 on their list of Top-Ten Charities Changing the World in 2015.  Popline points out that some health workers have biases against working with faith-based programs, but that the merits of the MAP International program should dispel these biases. It also discusses the financial benefits of FBOs in relation to “their ability to leverage volunteer work with minimal effort.”

On March 12, 2008, the California Attorney General filed a Cease and Desist Order against MAP International, along with a Notice of Revocation of Charity Registration and a Notice of Assessment of Penalties.  The Attorney General's order alleged that MAP International declared the wrong value of donated pharmaceuticals.  According to the complaint, MAP received donated pharmaceuticals (often near their expiration date) from various pharmaceutical companies, which MAP International made available, often through intermediaries such as Food for the Poor, to various relief agencies outside of the United States.  These pharmaceuticals, the order claimed, were either expressly prohibited from use in the United States or were understood to be restricted to non-US use.  The order stated that under the Generally Accepted Accounting Principles (GAAP), "charities can only claim 'fair market value' of gifts in kind" in a "principal market" or "most advantageous market," to which the charity must have access in valuing the asset (in this case, the pharmaceuticals).  The Attorney General's order alleged that MAP International claimed the US value of the pharmaceuticals, rather than their value in the countries to which they were destined, even though the drugs were restricted from use in the US.

On April 11, 2018, MAP filed an appeal of the California Attorney General's order.  A hearing was held on December 11, 2018.  On September 20, 2019, the Attorney General's office announced that it had secured a Cease and Desist Order and over $1 million in penalties against MAP International, Food for the Poor, and CMMB (Catholic Medical Mission Board), for deceptive solicitation tactics.

Current projects

Disaster relief 
MAP International works to respond to both natural and conflict related emergencies. MAP International provides medical relief shipments to those in need and monitors the health of those in need, if an emergency occurs in a country MAP International has instituted a country presence it implements a country office response in which MAP International staff mobilize to provide health care, and utilizes community based disaster mitigation to train community members to manage the effects of the disaster and promote health in the wake of the disaster on a long-term scale. Current MAP International disaster relief programs include Typhoon Haiyan: Philippines, Cyclone Phailin, Oklahoma Tornado, and Syrian Refugee relief. MAP International has responded to Typhoon Haiyan by shipping $4.2 million in medicines and supplies, and is still in the process of responding by providing emergency health care kits to victims. MAP International recognizes its partners for their integral role in efficiently distributing donated medicines and supplies, and states the difficulties they have encountered in getting the medicines to the victims. For example, all of the medicine shipments in Leyte Island were washed away when the typhoon hit that area.  In response to the detrimental effects of Cyclone Phailin, MAP International is providing India with temporary shelter structures, food, medicine, and cooking utensils. MAP International has responded to the Oklahoma Tornado by donating over $127,000 of supplies to their partner, Convoy of Hope, in Oklahoma. The U.S. Chamber of Commerce Foundation also mentions MAP International's affiliation with Abbott in response to the tornado. In response to the civil war in Syria, MAP International has sent two shipments to refugees, and is still responding by preparing a third shipment to send when sufficient funding is acquired. The Saporta Report outlines MAP International's involvement in Syrian Refugee Crisis relief efforts, and briefly describes the cost of these emergency aid kits.

Transformational missions 
A program to turn short-term missions into long-term local health programs.

Short-term missions 
Medical or non-medical volunteers from the United States help with an existing program in a Total Health Village, assisted by members of MAP International.

Curriculum-based field study 
Short-term field study for students integrated into the curriculum of a scholastic establishment for credit within the degree areas of health or international development.

MAP fellowship 
Opportunity for fourth year medical students to work during an 8-week program in a MAP-approved hospital or clinic, usually in Kenya, Uganda, Ecuador, Honduras, Bolivia, Indonesia, Liberia, Cote d’Ivore, or Ghana.

Partnership opportunities 
Volunteers are educated about a MAP Internal program and work with members of an underserved community to explore ways to collaborate with MAP International programs.

Disaster relief response 
Emergency aid teams from the United States respond quickly to help affected communities by implementing disaster management strategies and training community members to sustain these programs on a long-term basis.

Global essential medicines and supplies (GEMS) 
MAP International contributes over $250 million inexpensive bought and donated medicines and supplies to philanthropic relief organizations helping underserved communities each year. The medicines provided are from the Essential Drug List (EDL).

Maternal and child health 
MAP International has implemented programs in Ecuador, Uganda, Kenya, and Bolivia. These programs focus on a plethora of different topics including perinatal care, training health promoters, preventing sexual abuse, providing rehabilitation for victims of sexual abuse, and education.

Neglected tropical diseases 
MAP International has implemented programs in Kenya, Uganda, Ecuador, Honduras, Bolivia, Indonesia, Liberia, Cote d’Ivore, and Ghana to treat and prevent Guinea worm, Buruli ulcer, Leprosy, Yaws, Lymphatic filariasis, Chagas Disease, Soil-transmitted Helminthes, and Rabies. Programs to eradicate these diseases include vaccinations, education, water and sanitation efforts, awareness building, community mobilization, and operations.

Total health village 
MAP International has implemented programs in 65 villages throughout Kenya, Uganda, Ecuador, Honduras, Bolivia, Indonesia, Liberia, Cote d’Ivore, and Ghana to encourage and equip underserved communities to come up with their own innovative solutions to the daily challenges they face. This program focuses on local solutions to problems within the cultural context of the community and is designed to give the community command of the improvement plan. Community members take part in many aspects of other current projects listed such as water and sanitation efforts and disease treatment, as well as working to settle conflict, train local health promoters, and facilitate economic security.

Water and sanitation 
Water and Sanitation are aspects assimilated into all MAP International programs because of the significant impact they have on preventing disease and promoting other facets of Total Health. Water and Sanitation efforts involve building separate waste and clean drinking structures, providing water filters to communities, and establishing Community Led Total Sanitation programs. MAP International utilizes a sweat equity design to implement Sawyer water filters in underserved communities and implements a small-scale demonstration with the help of a few members in the community before introducing water sanitation efforts on a large-scale throughout the village. Sawyer attests to the integral role MAP International has played in distributing hundreds water filters to communities.  Community Led Total Sanitation programs are designed to educate and empower local community members to make their village a more sanitary and healthy environment through education about the negative health effects of drinking unclean water and the importance of separating human waste structures and drinking water structures.

References

Christian organizations established in 1954
International medical and health organizations
Christian missions
Medical missions
Christian medical missionaries